The Edward and Ida Soncarty Barn, at 1671 Deep Creek Rd. in Potlatch, Idaho, is a Gothic-arch barn built in 1928.  It was listed on the National Register of Historic Places in 2008.

References

Gothic-arch barns
Barns on the National Register of Historic Places in Idaho
Buildings and structures completed in 1928
Latah County, Idaho